Pod, released May 4, 2004 by Real World Records, is a remix album by Afro Celt Sound System of their first three albums, Volume 1: Sound Magic, Volume 2: Release, and Volume 3: Further in Time, done by members of the band and new artists as well, including some songs previously unavailable. It is also accompanied by a DVD of some music videos and some clips of their live tour.

Track listing
 "Rise Above" (remix by Simon Emmerson, James McNally and Simon ‘Mass’ Massey) – 6:17
 "Johnny at Sea" (mix by Martin Russell and Mass) – 4:48
 "Persistence of Memory" (remix by Rae & Christian) – 5:14
 "Further in Time" (remix by Mass) – 7:45
 "Full Moon Low Tide" (remix by DJ Toshio) – 4:34
 "Release" (remix by Rollo and Sister Bliss) – 4:58
 "Release it" (Masters At Work segue) – 1:20
 "Whirly 3" (remix by Emmerson, McNally and Mass) – 7:55
 "Riding the Skies" (remix by Mass and Simon Emmerson) – 6:04
 "Éireann" (remix by Mass) – 6:17
 "Release" (remix by BiPolar) – 5:30
 "When You're Falling" (remix by Wren and Morley) – 4:37
 "Lagan" (remix by Emmerson, McNally and Mass) – 4:36

Bonus DVD
 "Persistence of Memory" (music video)
 "When You're Falling" (music video)
 Highlights from WOMAD USA 2001
 "North" (5.1 surround sound and stereo mix music video)

References

Afro Celt Sound System albums
2004 remix albums
2004 video albums
Music video compilation albums
2004 compilation albums
Real World Records remix albums
Real World Records video albums
Real World Records compilation albums